Giano dell'Umbria is a comune (municipality) in the Province of Perugia in the Italian region Umbria, located about 35 km southeast of Perugia.

Geography
The municipality of Giano dell'Umbria contains the frazione (subdivision) of Bastardo.

The municipality borders the following municipalities: Castel Ritaldi, Gualdo Cattaneo, Massa Martana, Montefalco and Spoleto.

See also
 Jordanus of Giano

References

External links

 Official Site
 Thayer's Gazetteer of Umbria

Cities and towns in Umbria